Prunoy is a former commune in the Yonne department in Bourgogne-Franche-Comté in north-central France. On 1 January 2016, it was merged into the new commune of Charny-Orée-de-Puisaye.

The Château de Prunoy (former Château de Vienne) is a listed monument in the south of Prunoy. The Film Death of a Corrupt Man was shot on this property.

See also
Communes of the Yonne department

References

Former communes of Yonne